Clap Hands! Here Comes Charley! is a popular song that was written by Billy Rose, Ballard MacDonald and Joseph Meyer and was first published in 1925. The song was recorded by several popular singers of the era, including a version by Billy Murray in 1925, but the most popular version at that time was by Johnny Marvin. In the 1930s the song became the theme tune of British dance band pianist Charlie Kunz. In the 1960s, the song was used to promote Hormel chili, as in, "Clap hands, here comes chili...".

Filmed in Funny Lady.

References

External links 
"Clap Hands, Here Comes Charlie" list of recordings at Allmusic.com
Billy Murray with Jack Shilkret's Orchestra (Victor)1925

See also
1925 in music

1925 songs
American songs
Billy Murray (singer) songs
Jazz standards
Songs with lyrics by Ballard MacDonald
Songs with lyrics by Billy Rose
Songs written by Joseph Meyer (songwriter)